Poliana Abritta Martins Ferreira (September 18, 1975) is a Brazilian journalist. She is a reporter and presenter for TV Globo.
 
Between 2012 and 2013, she became a presenter on the Globo Mar chain. In 2014, she moved to New York to take on the role corresponding to string. Before moving to New York City, the journalist was a member of the team Jornal Hoje before going on maternity leave. The same year, Polianna is scheduled to play the role of Renata Vasconcellos in the television program Fantástico in November 2014, having your tattoo much talked about on social networks, on his debut.

TV news
 Globo Mar (2012 - 2013)
 Fantástico (until 2014).

Presenter eventual
 Jornal Hoje: (2011 – 2014)
 Jornal da Globo: (2012 – 2014)
 Bom Dia Brasil (2010 – 2012)

References

People from Brasília
Brazilian television presenters
Brazilian television journalists
Brazilian women journalists
1974 births
Living people
Women television journalists
Brazilian women television presenters